Sokolluzade Lala Mehmed Pasha (died 21 June 1606) was an Ottoman statesman from Serbian origin. He may have been a cousin of Sokollu Mehmed Pasha and served as tutor (lala) to a royal prince. He was the grand vizier between 1604 and 1606.

See also
List of Ottoman Grand Viziers

References

Serbs of Bosnia and Herzegovina
Bosnia and Herzegovina Muslims
People from the Ottoman Empire of Serbian descent
17th-century Grand Viziers of the Ottoman Empire
Devshirme
Lalas (title)
16th-century Grand Viziers of the Ottoman Empire
People of the Long Turkish War
1606 deaths